Major James Starr (April 5, 1870 – March 13, 1948), of Philadelphia, Pennsylvania, was one of the earliest philatelists who collected, studied, and wrote on, stamps of China.

Collecting interests
Starr was particularly interested in studying the large Dragons of 1878-1883 as well as China's air post issues. His collections on exhibit were famous and award-winning. Co-authored with Samuel J. Mills, Starr wrote The Chinese Air-Post, 1920–1935, which was based on his own collection of Chinese postal history. It was published around 1937.

Philatelic activity
Starr was a founding member of the China Stamp Society, the oldest affiliate of the American Philatelic Society and the largest English speaking Chinese philatelic organization worldwide. He was serving as its president at the time of his death.

Honors and awards
He won numerous awards for his exhibits at national and international philatelic exhibitions. He signed the Roll of Distinguished Philatelists in 1947 and was named to the American Philatelic Society Hall of Fame in 1949.

Legacy
Starr's intact China collection was sold at Sotheby's auction in 1991.

See also
Philately
Philatelic literature

References and sources
References

Sources

1870 births
1948 deaths
Philatelic literature
American philatelists
Writers from Philadelphia
American Philatelic Society